A prerogative instrument is a legal instrument issued in the United Kingdom under the royal prerogative, in contrast with a Statutory Instrument (which is made under the authority of an Act of Parliament).

Examples of prerogative instruments include letters patent (including most royal charters), royal instructions, royal warrants, and some orders in council.

The use of prerogative instruments has declined considerably both as a result of the transfer of political power from the Sovereign to the House of Commons, and with the expanded use since the nineteenth century of delegated legislation under the authority of parliament.

Prerogative instruments were often used as the basis for the constitutions of British colonies.

See also
 Prerogative writ

References

Constitutional law
Royal prerogative